The 2002 Colonial Athletic Association men's soccer season was the 20th season of men's college soccer in the Colonial Athletic Association, played from August until November 2002.

Results 

Source: CAA
(RC) = Regular season champion; (TC) = Tournament champion
Only applicable when the season is not finished:
(Q) = Qualified for conference tournament, but not to particular round indicated; (E) = Eliminated from conference tournament

Tournament

See also 
Colonial Athletic Association
2002 CAA Men's Soccer Tournament
2002 NCAA Division I men's soccer season
2002 NCAA Division I Men's Soccer Championship

References

External links